In Christ Alone may refer to:

Music
Songs
In Christ Alone, a Christian song by Keith Getty and Stuart Townend (2001). The song is subject of many covers. 
"In Christ Alone", a song by Don Koch and Shawn Craig and sung by Michael English. Also covered by Brian Littrell in his album Welcome Home

Albums
(in chronological order)
In Christ Alone: New Hymns for Prayer and Worship, a 2002 Worship Together album (USA release) also known as New Irish Hymns (original UK release)
Greatest Hits: In Christ Alone, a 2006 album by Michael English
In Christ Alone, a 2007 album by Keith & Kristyn Getty
In Christ Alone: Modern Hymns of Worship, a 2008 album by Bethany Dillon and Matt Hammitt

Books
In Christ Alone: Living the Gospel Centered Life, 2007 book by Sinclair B. Ferguson